Catedral de São Luís ("Cathedral of Our Lady of Victory") is the seat of the Roman Catholic Diocese of São Luís do Maranhão. It is located in Plaza Pedro II in the center of São Luís, Maranhão, Brazil. It is an important monument in the city's historic center, which was declared a World Heritage Site by UNESCO.

See also 
 List of Catholic churches in Brazil
 List of Jesuit sites

References

External links

São Luís
Buildings and structures in Maranhão
Portuguese colonial architecture in Brazil
Baroque church buildings in Brazil